The Krell are a fictional extinct technologically-advanced alien species from the 1956 science fiction film Forbidden Planet. The first human starship to land on the Krells' home planet of Altair IV, the Bellerophon, was destroyed, with the only survivors being Dr. Edward Morbius along with his wife (who later died of natural causes) and daughter.  In his isolation, Morbius became the lone researcher to ever study the extinct Krell.

Description

The Krell had reached an incredibly advanced stage of technological and scientific development, able to—among other things—reproduce down to the molecular level any matter for which they had a pre-existing sample to serve as a template.  Another Krell device that played a prominent role in the film was their "plastic educator", a device able to create a three-dimensional visualization of the operator's thoughts while acting directly on the brain to measure intelligence and impart knowledge. Although previously demonstrated to be fatal to humans, its use by Dr. Morbius had boosted his IQ such that he could understand some of the basic science of the Krell (allowing him, for instance, to "tinker together" the amazing Robby the Robot.).  

Morbius remarks that while his IQ has been boosted to over twice the human average, he would be a mentally handicapped "moron" compared to the Krell themselves.  Morbius also believed that the Krell, after millions of years of social advancement, were not only technologically but morally superior to humanity—a benevolent and noble race of scholars and pacifists, who had evolved beyond war and violence.  

Morbius, however, discovered that in a single day and night, 2,000 centuries past, the entire Krell race disappeared. In the time since, all above-ground evidence of their civilization had vanished.  He didn't know exactly what happened to them in this shockingly rapid cataclysmic event.  For that matter, Morbius did not know what the Krell looked like:  no record of their physical nature survived, except perhaps in the form of their characteristic arch which served as the doorway between rooms. This doorway, coming to a triangular point at the top and much wider at the middle than at the top and bottom, suggests a being of enormous girth.

During the events of the film, the starship C-57D arrives on Altair IV, 20 years after Morbius was trapped there.  After meeting them, Morbius gives the command crew a tour of the Krell's crowning achievement:  a vast underground  machine of virtually unlimited power, so advanced that it could give physical form to any matter they could conceive of, by remotely scanning their brain synapses—creation at mere thought, moving beyond the need for a pre-existing physical template, but based on limitless imagination.  

The C-57D'''s Lt. "Doc" Ostrow later uses the plastic educator, causing fatal injury to his brain, but briefly allowing him to infer the cause of the Krell downfall:  "Monsters from the Id".  Commander Adams confronts Morbius with this and is able to piece together what happened:  the Id is an ("obsolete" and outdated) term for the base subconscious mind, composed of raw, animalistic emotions like hate, lust, and jealousy.  The Krell machine was so advanced that it didn't just give physical form and life to their conscious thoughts, but their subconscious thoughts as well.  

Even for the advanced Krell this Freudian personality characteristic, although long forgotten, had not been eliminated. When combined with the power of their machine, the unbridled emotions of their Ids were all at once willed into physical reality: an army of living nightmares, let loose upon the entire planet.  Upon this realization, Morbius laments that the "poor Krell", benevolent pacifists who had eradicated violent thoughts from their conscious minds for over a million years, had no way of even understanding what was slaughtering them.

 In popular culture 
The 10 x 10 x 10 x 10 speech was used as a sample in 808 state track 10x10.
Science-fiction author Jamie Sawyer has used the name "Krell" for the hostile alien species in his Lazarus War series.
 In the web video series Yacht Rock, "Krell krell krell krell" is the "space-god of seafaring and smooth music".
The GKrellM (Gnu Krell Monitors) computer-monitoring package commemorates the image of Krell technology as portrayed in Forbidden Planet.
 The Krell are described as reptilian shapeshifters and the "adults" that they are disguised as, in guitarist John Fahey's fantastical "memoirs" How Bluegrass Music Destroyed My Life, and its sequel Vampire Vultures (Drag City Press 2000, 2003). 
The Department of Energy contractor, The Krell Institute, was named after the aliens in the movie.
 Science-fiction author Brandon Sanderson has used the name "Krell" for the hostile aliens in his Skyward series.
 In the science fiction video game Void Bastards, "Krell" is the name of an interstellar shipping corporation, who also own several space docks and a supermarket chain.

 Notes 

Reference: 1979 Cinefantastique Magazine Double-Issue (Volume 8 – Number 2 & Volume 8 – Number 3)
MAKING FORBIDDEN PLANET – By Frederick S. Clarke and Steve Rubin

The steps leading up to the Krell door ... were designed to be separated by a smooth ramp in the middle.

In the article the cinematographer of the Forbidden Planet'' film, George Folsey states:

The Krell were originally frog-like in nature with two long legs and a big tail. They were never shown, but it was indicated in the original screenplay that the ramps between the steps were designed to accommodate their dragging tail.

See also 
 Kardashev scale

References

External links
 

Fictional extraterrestrial life forms